The smooth breathing (psilí) is a diacritical mark used in polytonic orthography. In Ancient Greek, it marks the absence of the voiceless glottal fricative  from the beginning of a word.

Some authorities have interpreted it as representing a glottal stop, but a final vowel at the end of a word is regularly elided (removed) when the following word starts with a vowel and elision would not happen if the second word began with a glottal stop (or any other form of stop consonant). In his Vox Graeca, W.S. Allen accordingly regards the glottal stop interpretation as "highly improbable".

The smooth breathing mark is written as on top of one initial vowel, on top of the second vowel of a diphthong or to the left of a capital and also, in certain editions, on the first of a pair of rhos. It did not occur on an initial upsilon, which always has rough breathing (thus the early name  hy, rather than  y) except in certain pre-Koine dialects which had lost aspiration much earlier. 

The smooth breathing was kept in the traditional polytonic orthography even after the  sound had disappeared from the language in Hellenistic times. It has been dropped in the modern monotonic orthography.

History
The origin of the sign is thought to be the right-hand half ( ┤ ) of the letter H, which was used in some archaic Greek alphabets as  while in others it was used for the vowel eta. It was developed by Aristophanes of Byzantium to help readers discern between similar words. For example, ὅρος horos 'boundary' (rough breathing) and ὄρος oros 'mountain' (smooth breathing). In medieval and modern script, it takes the form of a closing half moon (reverse C) or a closing single quotation mark:
 
 

Smooth breathings were also used in the early Cyrillic and Glagolitic alphabets when writing the Old Church Slavonic language. Today it is used in Church Slavonic according to a simple rule: if a word starts with a vowel, the vowel has a psili over it. From the Russian writing system, it was eliminated by Peter the Great during his alphabet and font-style reform (1707). All other Cyrillic-based modern writing systems are based on the Petrine script, so they have never had the smooth breathing.

Coronis
The coronis (korōnís, "crow's beak" or "bent mark"), the symbol written over a vowel contracted by crasis, was originally an apostrophe after the letter: . In present use, its appearances in Ancient Greek are written over the medial vowel with the smooth breathing mark——and appearances of crasis in modern Greek are not marked.

Letters with smooth breathing mark

Unicode

See also 
 Greek diacritics
 Rough breathing
 Modifier letter right half ring (ʾ)
 Aleph

References

Greek-script diacritics
Cyrillic-script diacritics
Ancient Greek